Robin Staaf (born 26 September 1986 in Helsingborg), sometimes spelled , is a Swedish footballer who plays as a forward for Ängelholms FF.

Career
Staaf spent most of his youth at Helsingborgs IF. But when he turned 18 he wanted to move on and after local fourth tier club [[Ramlösa Södra FF
|Helsingborgs Södra BIS]] called him he decided to join them. The club changed its name to Ramlösa Södra FF in 2008 and Staaf had a prolific first half of the season which enabled him to move up four levels to Allsvenskan side Örebro SK. His time at Örebro was plagued with injuries and he left after the 2011 Allsvenskan season for Superettan club Ängelholms FF where he had previously been on loan.

International career
Staaf has represented both the Sweden national under-17 football team and the Sweden national under-19 football team.

Career statistics

References

External links

Örebro SK profile
Eliteprospects profile

1986 births
Living people
Association football forwards
Helsingborgs IF players
Örebro SK players
Allsvenskan players
Superettan players
Swedish footballers
Sportspeople from Helsingborg